The 1994 US Open was a tennis tournament played on outdoor hard courts at the USTA National Tennis Center in New York City in New York in the United States. It was the 114th edition of the US Open and was held from August 29 to September 11, 1994.

Seniors

Men's singles

 Andre Agassi defeated  Michael Stich 6–1, 7–6(7–5), 7–5
 It was Agassi's 2nd career Grand Slam singles title and his 1st US Open singles title. He became the first unseeded US Open champion in the Open Era.

Women's singles

 Arantxa Sánchez Vicario defeated  Steffi Graf 1–6, 7–6(7–3), 6–4
 It was Sánchez Vicario's 3rd career Grand Slam singles title and her only US Open singles title. She became the first Spanish woman to win a US Open singles title.

Men's doubles

 Jacco Eltingh /  Paul Haarhuis defeated  Todd Woodbridge /  Mark Woodforde 6–3, 7–6(7–1)
 It was Eltingh's 2nd career Grand Slam title and his only US Open title. It was Haarhuis' 2nd career Grand Slam title and his only US Open title.

Women's doubles

 Jana Novotná /  Arantxa Sánchez Vicario defeated  Katerina Maleeva /  Robin White 6–3, 6–3 
 It was Novotná's 10th career Grand Slam title and her 2nd US Open title. It was Sánchez Vicario's 6th career Grand Slam title and her 3rd and last US Open title.

Mixed doubles

 Elna Reinach /  Patrick Galbraith defeated  Jana Novotná /  Todd Woodbridge 6–2, 6–4
 It was Reinach's only career Grand Slam title. It was Galbraith's 1st career Grand Slam title and his 1st US Open title.

Juniors

Boys' singles

 Sjeng Schalken defeated  Mehdi Tahiri 6–2, 7–6

Girls' singles

 Meilen Tu defeated  Martina Hingis 6–2, 6–4

Boys' doubles

 Ben Ellwood /  Nicolás Lapentti defeated  Paul Goldstein /  Scott Humphries 6–2, 6–0

Girls' doubles

 Surina de Beer /  Chantal Reuter defeated  Nannie de Villiers /  Lizzie Jelfs 4–6, 6–4, 6–2

External links
 Official US Open Website

 
 

 
US Open
US Open (tennis) by year
US Open
US Open
US Open
US Open